The 1984 Iowa State Cyclones football team represented Iowa State University as a member of the Big Eight Conference during the 1984 NCAA Division I-A football season. Led by second-year head coach Jim Criner, the Cyclones compiled an overall record of 2–7–2 with a mark of 0–5–2 in conference play, placing last in the Big 8. Iowa State played home games at Cyclone Stadium in Ames, Iowa.

Schedule

Game summaries

at Iowa

Oklahoma

Nebraska

References

Iowa State
Iowa State Cyclones football seasons
Iowa State Cyclones football